The little magazine movement originated in the 1950s and 1960s in many Indian languages like Bengali, Tamil, Marathi, Hindi, Malayalam and Gujarati, in the early part of the 20th century.

Little magazine movement in Marathi

Little magazines of 1955 to 1975 
The avant-garde modernist poetry burst upon the Marathi literary world with the poetry of B. S. Mardhekar in the mid-forties. The period 1955–1975 in Marathi literature is dominated by the little magazine movement. It ushered in modernism and the Dalit movement. In the mid-1950s, Dilip Chitre, Arun Kolatkar and their friends started a cyclostyled Shabda. The little magazine movement began to spread like wildfire in 2017 with hundreds of ephemeral to relatively longer lasting magazines including Aso, Vacha, Lru, Bharud and Rucha. The movement brought forth a new generation of writers who were dissatisfied with the Marathi literary establishment which they saw as bourgeois, upper caste and orthodox. Ashok Shahane was the pioneer of the little magazine movement in Marathi in the 1960s. The writers such as Dilip Chitre, Arun Kolatkar, Namdeo Dhasal, Tulsi Parab, Bhalchandra Nemade, Manohar Oak, Bhau Padhye, Vilas Sarang and Vasant Abaji Dahake came to prominence with the movement. Their writing is non-conformist and non-populist. The little magazine movement of the 1960s ran out of steam in the mid-1970s. A representative translation of many poets of this period has been done by Dilip Chitre.

Little magazines of the 1990s and 2000s
The economic reforms of the nineties in India ushered in an era of liberalization, privatization and globalization in Indian society. The boom in the telecommunications sector, cable and satellite television and digital revolution came in tandem with these economic reforms and deeply affected Indian society and culture. Mumbai, being the economic capital of India, felt the overwhelming force of these dramatic changes. Little magazines resurfaced in this period. Abhidhanantar, Shabdavedk, Saushthav and later on Aivaji, Khel, Anaghrat, and Navakshar Darshan burst upon the scene. The poets such as Manya Joshi, Mangesh Narayanrao Kale, Hemant Divate, Sanjeev Khandekar, Saleel Wagh and Sachin Ketkar who emerged from these little magazines of the 1990s bear witness to the social and cultural transformation, writing with a sensibility that is different from the generation that emerged from the movement of the 1960.

Bengali little magazine movement

Early 20th century
In Bengali literature, it started with Kallol, a modernist movement magazine, established in 1923. The most popular among the group were Kazi Nazrul Islam (1899–1976), Mohitlal Majumder (1888–1952), Achintyakumar Sengupta (1903–1976), Satyendranath Dutta (1882–1922), and Premendra Mitra (1904–1988). Then Bengali poetry got into the brightest light of modernism in the 1930s, through the movement of a few other little magazines, such as Buddhadeb Basu's Kabita and Sudhindranath Datta's Parichay.

Taputtap
This magazine is based on the widely circulated literature, education, culture and social news of India and the state of West Bengal Asansol. It has been published since 1978.

Krittibas
Krittibas first appeared in Kolkata in 1953. It played a highly influential role in the Kolkata literary scene in the decades after Indian independence, and provided a platform for young, experimental poets, many of whom went on to become luminaries of modern Bengali poetry.
The editors of the inaugural issue in July 1953 were Sunil Gangopadhyay, Ananda Bagchi and Dipak Mazumdar. Gangopadhyay later became sole editor, and indeed it is his name that is most closely associated with the magazine. Others who also edited the magazine at one point or another included Shakti Chattopadhyay, Sarat Kumar Mukhopadhyay and Samarendra Sengupta. The Phanishwarnath Renu issue of the magazine was edited by Samir Roychoudhury. During 1961-65 several poets left the magazine and joined the Hungryalist Movement.

Hungry Generation and anti-establishment movements
The little magazine explosion in West Bengal took place after 1961 when the Hungry Generation Movement took the cultural establishment by storm. In fact it changed not only the types of publication but also the naming of magazines. The Hungry Generation Movement aimed at waging a war against the literary establishment and the decadent society in general. Prominent figures included Binoy Mazumdar, Saileswar Ghosh, Malay Roy Choudhury, Subimal Basak, Tridib Mitra, Samir Roychoudhury, Falguni Roy, Subo Acharjo, Pradip Choudhuri, Subhas Ghosh, Basudeb Dasgupta, Sandipan Chattopadhyay, Shakti Chattopadhyay. Utpalkumar Basu, Rabindra Guha, Arunesh Ghosh, Raja Sarkar, Aloke Goswami, Selim Mustafa, Arup Datta, Rasaraj Nath, Rabiul and many others..

There are other Bengali Writers who raised their voice against the establishment but did not join the Hungry generation Movement. Most notable among them is the Subimal Mishra.
Other experimental writers who mostly wrote in little magazines include Kamal Kumar Majumdar, Amiyabhushan Majumdar and Udayan Ghosh.

'Kaurab' cult
Some major changes occurred in the 1970s in the Bengali little magazine movement, chiefly around Kaurab, a literary and cultural magazine nearly four decades old. Prime cult-figures of Kaurab are: Swadesh Sen, Kamal Chakraborty (original editor), Barin Ghosal, Debajyoti Dutta, Pranabkumar Chattopadhyay, Shankar Lahiri, Sidhartha Basu, Shankar Chakraborty and Aryanil Mukhopadhyay (present editor). In international scenario Bengali poetry has been represented by Kaurab poets like Subhro Bandopadhyay, (present assistant editor).

New Poetry (Natun Kabita)
Since the mid-1980s Bengali literature experienced a new genre of Bengali poetry called New Poetry. From the early 1990s with impetus from a Kolkata-based poetry journal Kabita Campus, New Poetry has begun to gain immense acclaim from the young contemporary poets of Bengal. In 2003 some poets of this genre have started a journal named Natun Kabita containing their ideas and poems, through both online and print media. Poets who joined this movement in the mid-1990s are: Barin Ghosal, Ranjan Moitro, Swapan Roy, Dhiman Chakraborty, Alok Biswas, Pronob Pal, Saumitra Sengupta, Rajarshi Chattopadhyay, Atanu Bandopadhyay, Rajatendra Mukhopadhay, Pradip Chakraborty.

New Age (New Century)
In West Bengal the first decade of this century (2001–10) is considered to be the period of a New Age little magazine movement. There are various type of little magazine, ranging from political to economic issues.  The magazines prominent in this period are: 'Vish(ভিস্)()run by Chandan Bangal and Tanmoy roy,Boikhori Bhaashyo run by Indranil Ghosh and Debanjan das, Ashtray run by Nabendu Bikash Roy and Arka Chattopadhyay,'Meghjanmo(মেঘজন্ম),Aahir (আহির),Sanjhbati (সাঁঝবাতি), Lalon(লালন),Joydhak(জয়ঢাক), "Chandrobhas" published from the Bangla Kobita Academy and edited by reputed poet and critic Ajit Trivedi, Nabamanab (নবমানব), "Moth" (মথ), Monvashi(মনভাষী) Bodhshabdo (বোধশব্দ), VAPRA, Pratishedhak (প্রতিষেধক), GhoMosh, Lemosh, snO yI, Abosardanga, Ashtray, Somoyer Shobdo(সময়ের শব্দ),"ebRo khebRo rong", "resurrection", "deowal", "aachhi", "jatnaghar", "mahool", "daur", "batighar", "Kaw (Arani)/ Kobia", "uttar etihas", " craker", "tabu abhiman", "manthan", "adorer nouka", "elora", "duende", Sutorang, point blank range, Sarbonam, "Hiranyagarva", "Kakkhapath", "Roderang","Ekti Ujwal Mach", "Shunyo Degree".

2nd decade (2011–present)

Magazines prominent in this period are:  " Eksho Ashi Degree " (একশো আশি ডিগ্রি ), Diganto (দিগন্ত পত্রিকা), " Bohemian ", "Jatnoghar " (যত্নঘর), "Charbak ", "Doshomik ", "Sreemayee ", "Saptannoyi" (সপ্তান্বয়ী), "Angick" (আঙ্গিক), "Eka ebong koyekjon", প্রহেলিকা (prohelika), "BongQ (বঙ্কু)" (LGBTQ+ related), "Nibirh (নিবিড়)", "Pather Sujan (পথের সুজন)", Barnik (previously known as Srijan), Ratri Sob Jane (রাত্রি সব জানে), "URNAPATRA" (উর্ণপত্র), Daakbaksho (ডাকবাক্স), Opodarther Adyokkhor (অপদার্থের আদ্যক্ষর).

Prominent figures rising from the period are:
Swagata Dasgupta, Himalay Jana, Deb Maity, Atanu Singha, Saibal Sarkar, Chandan Bangal, Prabir Chakraborty, Rajdip Roy, Abhisek Chakraborty, Somabrata Sarkar, Mujibar Ansary, Sanghamitra halder, Souptik Chakraborty, Anamoy Kalindi, Rajib Ghoshal, Achinta Maji, Niramoy Mudi, Somtirtha Sarkar, Susnato Chowdhury, Sayan Sarkar,Sambuddha Ghosh, Somen Mukhopadhay, Animikh Patra, Ratul Pal,Saurav Chattopadhyay, Himadri Mukhopadhyay, Arunava Chattopadhyay, Biswadip Dey, Debabrata Kar Biswas, Suman Sadhu, Sambit Basu, Rik Amrit, Akash Gangopadhyay, Prithwi Basu, Dipangshu Acharya, Somtirtha Nandi, Samitava Banerjee, Rahul Guha Dey, Manidipa Singha, Ritam Sen, Ripan Arya, Santanu Das, Somnath Ghosal, Swadesh Mishra,  Arko Chattopadhyay, Alokparna, Saurav Sarker, Ripon Fio, Sumit Sikdar, Adhya, Santanu Das, Shriya Biswas, Kumaraditya Sarkar, Tanmoy Ray, Sourav Saha, Kishalay Thakur, Suprabhat Roy, Sukriti, Dhrubo Mukhopadhyay, Jubin Ghosh, Biswajit Roy, Subrata Saha, Subhankar Paul, Partha Pratim Roy, Arjun Bandopadhyay, Anjan Das, Joyshila Guha Bagchi, Sovan Sengupta, Sreyon, Megh Santanu, Sankhayan Nanda, Suvadip Chakraborty, Maharshi Dutta.

 Postmodern Bengali poetry 
Samir Roychoudhury and Prabhat Choudhuri heralded a new phase in Bengali poetry in 1990s known as Postmodern or Adhunantika Poetry with the launching of Haowa#49 quarterly and Kabita Pakshik fortnightly, respectively. However the interpretation of Postmodernism are quite different for both the magazines.

Little Magazine Library and Research Centre
There is a Little Magazine Library and Research Centre at 9, Tamer Lane (run by Sandip Dutta since 1978), Kolkata-700009, India, which collects Bengali little magazines published anywhere in the world.

Midnapore Little Magazine Library
Midnapore Little Magazine Library – A digital library for little magazines of East and West Medinipur district. Information about more than 600 little magazines published from Medinipur District, from the year 1870 to now.

Sahitya Academy
The Sahitya Akademi (Indian Academy of Letters) also publishes two literary journals, namely Indian Literature in English and Samkalin Bhartiya Sahitya in Hindi. However they cannot be considered as "little magazines" as they have state support and appear regularly. A prime example of this continuing tradition is The Little Magazine, published from New Delhi since May 2000., Civil Lines and Yatra

Grasshoppers
In January 2014, little magazine movement got a new way to spread their voice. Arunava Chatterjee, a Kolkata-based IT Entrepreneur and writer, formed Grasshoppers! - the first ever e-Commerce website for selling little magazines online along with one of the most eminent magazine Ekak Matra. It is already actively spreading in different areas across the world with a strong delivery backbone.

 Little magazine movement in Indian English Literature 

 Indian Literature (journal) - It is official English Language literary journal published bi-monthly by the Sahitya Akademi .
 Kavya Bharati - An annual journal, The Study Centre for Indian Literature in English and Translation
 Coldnoon: Travel Poetics - International Journal of Travel Writing
 Kritya- A bilingual journal of international poetry.- www.kritya.in
Indology -An English literary  magazine published from Raiganj in the district of Uttar Dinajpur. This is the oldest existing printed English literary magazine of North Dinajpur  and oldest existing printed English magazine of West Bengal.  Binay Laha is the editor of Indology Magazine. 

Bengali little magazines in India

 Abhidhanantar-Marathi little magazine
Basabhumi Patrika (বাসভূমি পত্রিকা)
 Drighangchoo Kaurab - Perhaps the most influential of the contemporary Bengali little magazines with both online and print editions. www.kaurab.com
 Tuskuti Magazine -One of the important Bengali magazine edited by Binay Laha. It is published from North Bengal. 
 KLEDAJA KUSUM An Extraordinary Poetry Magazine in Bengali literature (Editor- Pranabkumar Chattopadyay . Nimta) .www.kledajakusum.com Urnapatra (Editor : Anjan Das, Published from Bolpur-Santiniketan by BCHHSH)
 VISH (Editor : Chandan Bangal) Published from Medinipur and Bankura
 Diganto (Editor : Sovan Sengupta) Published from Purbasha, Barrackpore, Kolkata 700122
 জ্বলদর্চি (Editor : Ritwik Tripathy)

Literary Bengali little magazines in BangladeshNagar (since 2008; edited by Syed Mobnu)Chowhatta (since 2017; edited by Nawaz Marjan)Choitrika (since 2016; edited by Sayyid Mujaddid)Polimati (since 2015; edited by Bashirul Amin) & Shibbir Ahmed)Shankhachil (since 2015; edited by Mafuz Pathok) & Iqbal Mahfuz)Ekobingsho  (since 2001; Bengali little magazine edited by Khondakar Ashraf Hossain)Puspakrath (edited by Hafiz Rashid Khan)Samujjal Sabatash'' (since 1991; edited by Hafiz Rashid Khan)
Urnapatra (Editor : Anjan Das, Published from Bolpur-Santiniketan by BCHHSH)
kali o kolom(since 2004)

References

Bengali-language literature